The Hillary Shield is contested between England and New Zealand at rugby union. The first match was played on 29 November 2008 at Twickenham Stadium, London.

The trophy is named in memory of the New Zealand mountaineer and explorer, Sir Edmund Hillary. The shield was announced on 23 October 2008 by Jock Hobbs, the Chairman of the New Zealand Rugby Union. It was made by silversmiths Thomas Lyte.

Matches

Results
 – Summer Test
 – Autumn International

See also
History of rugby union matches between England and New Zealand

References

History of rugby union matches between England and New Zealand
Rugby union international rivalry trophies
International rugby union competitions hosted by England
International rugby union competitions hosted by New Zealand
2008 establishments in England
2008 establishments in New Zealand
Edmund Hillary